WSIL-TV (channel 3) is a television station licensed to Harrisburg, Illinois, United States, serving as the ABC affiliate for Southern Illinois, Southeast Missouri, the Purchase area of Western Kentucky, and Northwest Tennessee. Owned by Allen Media Broadcasting, the station maintains studios on Country Aire Drive (IL 13) in Carterville and a transmitter near Creal Springs, Illinois.

KPOB-TV (channel 15) in Poplar Bluff, Missouri, operates as a full-time satellite of WSIL-TV; this station's transmitter is located along US 60/67 in Poplar Bluff. KPOB-TV covers areas of southeastern Missouri and northeastern Arkansas that receive a marginal to non-existent over-the-air signal from WSIL-TV, although there is significant overlap between the two stations' contours otherwise. KPOB-TV is a straight simulcast of WSIL-TV; on-air references to KPOB-TV are limited to Federal Communications Commission (FCC)-mandated hourly station identifications during newscasts and other programming. Aside from the transmitter, KPOB-TV does not maintain any physical presence locally in Poplar Bluff.

WSIL-TV can also be seen on a digital translator, K10KM-D (channel 10), in Cape Girardeau, Missouri.

History
WSIL signed-on for the first time December 1, 1953, as the first television station to sign on in southern Illinois and the Illinois–Kentucky–Missouri tri-state area. It originally broadcast an analog signal on UHF channel 22, but moved to VHF channel 3 in March 1959 as did numerous stations originally assigned to UHF allocations before the Federal Communications Commission (FCC) mandated that television-set manufacturers include UHF tuning capability in their products in 1964. The original UHF transmitter had been built in Harrisburg before Paducah, Harrisburg, and Cape Girardeau had been collapsed into one large market. The station moved its facilities from Harrisburg to Carterville in 1989.

However, some parts of Southeast Missouri could not receive channel 3's signal clearly, presumably because WSIL had to conform it to protect co-channel WREC-TV (now WREG-TV) in Memphis, Tennessee in the next market to the south. As a result, KPOB signed-on September 15, 1967 to provide service to those counties.

WSIL was the first station in the market to broadcast a digital signal at a full 1 megawatt of power (equivalent to 5 megawatts in analog) on October 22, 2002. It was also the first to air a mobile digital signal.

On January 3, 2018, WSIL and KPOB began airing Heroes & Icons on their .2 subchannels.

On October 31, 2018, it was announced that Quincy Media would acquire WSIL and KPOB for $24.5 million. WSIL would be Quincy's fourth station in its home state of Illinois. The sale was approved by the FCC on December 20. The sale was completed on January 15, 2019.

On January 7, 2021, less than two years after acquiring WSIL, Quincy Media announced that it had put itself up for sale. A few weeks later, Gray Television announced its intent to purchase Quincy for $925 million. As Gray already owns the market's KFVS-TV and both that and WSIL rank among the top four in ratings in the Paducah–Cape Girardeau–Harrisburg market, it intended to keep KFVS and sell WSIL (and KPOB) in order to satisfy FCC requirements. On April 29, 2021, it was announced that Allen Media Broadcasting would acquire WSIL, KPOB and the remaining Quincy stations not being acquired by Gray Television for $380 million. The sale was completed on August 2.

Programming
Syndicated programming on WSIL includes Tamron Hall, The Drew Barrymore Show, and Rachael Ray, among others.

For many years, WSIL did not air the weeknight broadcasts of ABC News, broadcasting instead a children's show featuring cartoons and Three Stooges shorts in the 5:30 to 6:30 time slot. It was not until sometime in the late-1970s it became the last ABC affiliate in the United States to abandon the practice of preempting the network news. However, in ABC's earlier years, quite a number of local stations did not carry the newscasts because their ratings trailed competitors CBS and NBC by a large margin. This changed when ABC initiated the World News Tonight format in 1978, finally establishing the network as a significant news operation.

The station was one of the ABC affiliates that refused to air NYPD Blue during its first season in 1993–1994. Station Manager Steve Wheeler appeared on Good Morning America to explain his decision. During the interview with Charles Gibson, Wheeler announced that if the program was successful, WSIL would reconsider. During this first season, Fox affiliate KBSI aired the program during the assigned network slot Tuesdays nights at 9 Central Time.

News operation
WSIL's newscasts are known as News 3 WSIL.

On January 18, 2004, the news operation underwent a major renovation, including the set, logo and on-air graphics. Some personnel changes were also made.

On October 6, 2010, WSIL became the first station in the market to offer news in high definition.

Notable current on-air staff
 Jason Lindsey – freelance meteorologist

Notable former on-air staff
 Christen Drew – reporter
 Briggs Gordon – children's show host
 Tony Laubach – meteorologist; Weather Warrior

Technical information

Subchannels
The stations' digital signals are multiplexed:

Analog-to-digital conversion
Both stations shut down their analog signals, respectively on June 12, 2009, the official date in which full-power television stations in the United States transitioned from analog to digital broadcasts under federal mandate. The station's digital channel allocations post-transition are as follows:
 WSIL-TV shut down its analog signal, over VHF channel 3; the station's digital signal remained on its pre-transition UHF channel 34. Through the use of PSIP, digital television receivers display the station's virtual channel as its former VHF analog channel 3.
 KPOB-TV shut down its analog signal, over UHF channel 15; the station's digital signal relocated from its pre-transition UHF channel 18 to channel 15.

References

External links
WSIL-TV/KPOB-TV
WSIL Station History

ABC network affiliates
Heroes & Icons affiliates
True Crime Network affiliates
Court TV affiliates
Ion Television affiliates
Television stations in the Paducah–Cape Girardeau–Harrisburg market
Television channels and stations established in 1953
1953 establishments in Illinois
Entertainment Studios